Warren Peyton (born 13 December 1979) is an English footballer who played in the Football League for Rochdale and Bury.

Peyton signed for Conference club Leigh RMI on a two-year deal in July 2003. He made his debut in the opening game of the 2003–04 season and played the full 90 minutes as RMI beat Dagenham & Redbridge 2–1 at Hilton Park. On 29 November, he scored his first goal for Leigh in the 2−2 draw with Forest Green Rovers at The Lawn Ground.

Peyton made his debut at Altrincham on 12 November 2005, against Exeter City. Peyton is chiefly a left-side midfielder, although he can also play at left-back.

Peyton is also an accomplished bricklayer, helping out in building turnstiles for  Altrincham's stadium.

As part of cost-cutting measures, Peyton was released from Altrincham on 12 May 2009 along with Chris Lane and Joe O'Neill

Peyton then joined Conference North team Stalybridge Celtic along with former Altrincham player Joe O'Neill.

In June 2010, Peyton joined newly promoted Guiseley, again with teammate Joe O'Neill.

In August 2011, Peyton joined Conference North rivals Droylsden.

References

External links

Living people
English footballers
Association football midfielders
English Football League players
National League (English football) players
England semi-pro international footballers
Fletcher Moss Rangers F.C. players
Rochdale A.F.C. players
Bury F.C. players
Nuneaton Borough F.C. players
Doncaster Rovers F.C. players
Leigh Genesis F.C. players
Altrincham F.C. players
Guiseley A.F.C. players
1979 births
Stalybridge Celtic F.C. players
British bricklayers
Droylsden F.C. players